Qurul may refer to:
 Qurul-e Olya
 Qurul-e Sofla